Westfield Old Orchard, formerly Old Orchard Shopping Center, is an upscale shopping mall in the Chicago metropolitan area. It is located in Skokie, Illinois. Anchor stores include Nordstrom and Macy's.

History
Westfield Old Orchard opened in October 1956 with Marshall Field and Company, Saks Fifth Avenue, and The Fair Department Store. Fair was renamed to Montgomery Ward in 1964. Two parking structures, the North and West Garages, were built in 1978. Saks Fifth Avenue moved to a larger location in 1978, selling their previous store to Lord & Taylor.

The Montgomery Ward closed in 1988. In 1991, Nordstrom announced plans to open its second Chicago area location at Old Orchard. In addition to the 200,000 square foot Nordstrom, Old Orchard also expanded the mall by 100,000 square feet as part of a $200 million expansion. This allowed for an additional 62 stores to open. Following the Nordstrom announcement Old Orchard also announced plans to bring in a fifth tenant: Bloomingdale's. A number of other tenants also underwent renovations, including Crate & Barrel and The Limited. In 1993, Lord & Taylor relocated and expanded its store. Maggiano's Little Italy opened to customers on October 28, 1994. A Barnes & Noble Booksellers also opened that year.

The shopping center was completely redesigned in the 1990s, with the opening of the Nordstrom department store on October 7, 1994 and Bloomingdale's, Abercrombie & Fitch, Ann Taylor, Cache, FAO Schwarz, The Limited, Record Town, Talbot's and Victoria's Secret in September 1995. Three months later, Pottery Barn opened to the public. That same year, a five-story parking garage and a movie theatre were added.

In 2004, Toms Price Furniture opened to guests. In 2005, Foot Locker and Cold Stone Creamery opened for the first time. In June of that same year, Saks Fifth Avenue closed and during the following year, it was demolished in an effort to scale the mall down and more renovations began in the process. Marshall Field's was officially renamed Macy's on September 9, 2006.

Old Orchard underwent a $50 million expansion and renovation and reopened in late 2007. On October 4, 2008, ZARA opened its doors for the first time.

Old Orchard is referenced by name in Mean Girls, which takes place in the North Shore neighborhoods north of the city of Chicago. However, in the film the mall is shown as being an enclosed center. This is because the scenes were actually filmed at Sherway Gardens in Toronto, Ontario, Canada.

Buffalo Wild Wings opened in 2015.

In December 2017, it was announced that the Lord & Taylor location at the mall would be closing.

After 27 years of operation, the Barnes & Noble Westfield Old Orchard location officially ceased operations on December 24, 2021. It reopened in a new location in the mall a year later.

In August 2022, it was announced that Bloomingdale's will be closing in fall 2022 and opening a small-format store called Bloomie's, occupying the old Barnes & Noble space. Bloomingdale’s will be demolished and replaced with about 350 apartments and a town square for events.

Bus routes 
CTA

 54A North Cicero/Skokie Blvd
  97 Skokie
 201 Central/Ridge

Pace

  208 Golf Road
 215 Crawford/Howard
 422 Linden CTA/Glenview/Northbrook Court

See also
Westfield Corporation

References

External links
Official Westfield Old Orchard website

Old Orchard
Skokie, Illinois
Shopping malls established in 1956
Shopping malls in Cook County, Illinois
1956 establishments in Illinois